After Marriage: Rethinking Marital Relationships is a 2016 book edited by Elizabeth Brake in which the authors provide a philosophical investigation of marriage.

Reception
The book was reviewed by Raja Halwani, Mara Marin and James Ryerson.

Essays
 Liberal Neutrality and Civil Marriage, Simon Căbulea May
 Is Civil Marriage Illiberal?, Ralph Wedgwood
 The Limitations of Contract: Regulating Personal Relationships in a Marriage-Free State, Clare Chambers
 Is Marriage Bad for Children? Rethinking the Connection Between Having Children, Romantic Love, and Marriage, Samantha Brennan and Bill Cameron
 Equality and Non-hierarchy in Marriage: What Do Feminists Really Want?, Elizabeth Brake
 Liberty and Polygamy, Peter de Marneffe
 Polygamy, Privacy, and Equality, Laurie Shrage
 Temporary Marriage, Daniel Nolan
 The (Dis)value of Commitment to One's Spouse, Anca Gheaus

References

External links 

2016 non-fiction books
Ethics books
Oxford University Press books
Books in political philosophy
Books about the philosophy of sexuality
Books about marriage
Books about same-sex marriage
Edited volumes